The 1967 Trophées de France season was the fourth and final season of the Trophées de France Formula 2 championship. The season was dominated by Jochen Rindt, winning three out of the four events, driving a Brabham BT23-Cosworth for the Roy Winkelmann Racing team. In the fourth race of the season, Rindt finished second to Jackie Stewart's Matra MS7-Cosworth.

Trophées de France
Champion:  Jochen Rindt

Runner Up:  Jackie Stewart

Results

Table

References

Trophées de France seasons